Vehicle registration plates of Georgia are composed of an embossed serial of two letters, a hyphen, three numbers, a hyphen, and two letters (e.g. AB-115-BA), in black on a white background with a blue vertical strip on the left.  The plates are issued in the Latin alphabet. Georgian registration plates are the same size as the most common European registration plate. All plates have the abbreviation "GE" in the lower left corner of the plate and the national flag in the upper left corner. This set of new style registration plates have been in use since 1 September 2014.

A new, European-style of registration plate was introduced on 1 September 2014. These have sets of two letters first and last (like French and Italian registration plates), with three numerals in the middle. A blue strip on the left contains the Georgian flag and a "GE", and there is a small security hologram on the bottom right. As additional security features, the plates have a watermark-like symbol of the LEPL Service Agency of MIA of Georgia and a machine-readable data matrix code near the hologram. The old style plates with three letters, a hyphen and three numbers (e.g. ABC-775), in black on a white background, became invalid in September 2020. 
To accommodate owners of imported American or Japanese vehicles, a more square styled plate is also available.

Previous series 

Between 1977 and 1993, georgian registration plates were manufactured in accordance with the Soviet GOST 3207-77 standard. The alphanumeric sequence took the form of: x #### XX, where x is a lowercase Cyrillic serial/counter letter; # is any digit in the range 0-9; and XX are two uppercase Cyrillic letters indicating where the vehicle was first registered.

Georgia used codes ГА, ГГ and ГР without particularity of territory, АИ was only used for Abkhazia, and ЮО was only used for South Ossetia.

Former vehicular designations
Originally the first letter of the old registration plate was assigned according to the territory where the vehicle was registered:

 A - Tbilisi
 B - Adjara
 C - Abkhazia
 D - Kutaisi
 E - Rustavi
 F - Zugdidi
 N - Akhaltsikhe
 O - Gori
 P - Mtskheta
 R - Telavi
 S - Bolnisi

Once the system was exhausted, it was removed. Anyone may buy the combination that they like. Some commercial organizations have bought up all the number sequences of the old registration plates within one tri-letter combination (e.g. all the TBC plates are owned by TBC Bank, and all the MZE plates are owned by Mze TV Company). Ambulances had plates in the PSP series, after the pharmaceutical company sponsoring them, and fire engines have plates in the SOS series.

Embassies and consulates
Embassy and consulate vehicles have their own registration plate with white characters and white numbers on a red background. Numbers on embassy plates are formatted so that the first two digits represent the foreign entity/organization the vehicle is registered, followed by a CMD, D or AS. The last three digits are sequential, where XX CMD 001 is (generally) the Ambassador's flag car. For a list of foreign entity/organization and their first digits, see below:

Abkhazia and South Ossetia
The self-proclaimed republics of Abkhazia and South Ossetia issue their own registration plates: Russian-style plates in Abkhazia and Soviet-style plates in South Ossetia. Since 2004 these registration plates are forbidden to be used on the territory controlled by the government of Georgia; while the Georgian plates are not allowed to be used on the territory controlled by republics. Thus most cars that cross the boundaries of the unrecognised republics have to use Russian registration plates.

Military plates

As of 2011, military police patrol vehicle plates were black with white letters, with a narrow yellow strip on the left containing the letters "GA" above each other. The code was two Latin letters followed by three numerals, with a safety hologram separating them. Regular military license plates receive a green strip on the left.

References

External links
 Vehicle registration rules (official page)

External links

Georgia (country)
Road transport in Georgia (country)
Georgia (country) transport-related lists
 Registration plates